This is a list of shipwrecks located in, and off the coast of, Florida.

Bay County

Brevard County

Broward County

Charlotte County

Dixie County

Duval County

Escambia County

Franklin County

Hillsborough County

Indian River County

Manatee County

Martin County

Miami-Dade County

Monroe County

Okaloosa County

Palm Beach County

Pinellas County

Sarasota County

St. Johns County

St. Lucie County

Tampa Bay

Volusia County

References

Further reading

Florida
 
Shipwrecks